Vesala is a neighborhood in eastern Helsinki, Finland. It is a part of the Mellunkylä district. The residential housing in the area consists mostly of single-family houses built in the 1950s and 1960s and apartment buildings built in the 1980s.

Gallery

References 

Neighbourhoods of Helsinki